Fanny is a 2013 film adaptation of the 1931 play of the same name by Marcel Pagnol. It stars Daniel Auteuil, Victoire Bélézy, Raphaël Personnaz, Marie-Anne Chazel, Jean-Pierre Darroussin, Daniel Russo, Ariane Ascaride and Nicolas Vaude. Auteuil also directed and wrote the screenplay.

Cast 
 Daniel Auteuil as César 
  as Fanny
 Jean-Pierre Darroussin as Panisse
 Raphaël Personnaz as Marius 
 Marie-Anne Chazel as Honorine
 Nicolas Vaude as Monsieur Brun
 Daniel Russo as Escartefigue
 Ariane Ascaride as Claudine
 Jean-Louis Barcelona as Frisepoulet
 Georges Neri as Elzéar
 Martine Diotalevi as Madame Escartefigue
 Michèle Granier as Anaïs     
 Aline Choisi as Rosaline
 Vivette Choisi as Madame Roumieux

Critical response 
On the review aggregator website Rotten Tomatoes, the film has an approval rating of 63%, based on 8 reviews, with an average rating of 4.9/10. On Metacritic, the film has a weighted average score of 47 out of 100, based on 7 critics, indicating "mixed or average reviews".

Accolades

References

External links

French romantic drama films
2010s French-language films
French films based on plays
Films based on works by Marcel Pagnol
2013 romantic drama films
2013 films
Remakes of French films
Films scored by Alexandre Desplat
Films directed by Daniel Auteuil
2010s French films